Saponé is a town in the Saponé Department of Bazèga Province in central Burkina Faso. The town has a population of 21,148 and is the capital of Saponé Department and is located approximately 40 kilometres south of Ouagadougou.

Geography
The nearest towns and villages include Kologonaba (0.8 nm), Ouidi (0.7 nm), Nabitenga (1.3 nm), Bonogo (1.4 nm), Tanlilli (1.4 nm), Goden (1.7 nm) and Sakpelse (1.0 nm).this is a little ville

Sister city
 Brest, France

Economy
The economy is dominated by cotton production. The harvest takes place in October and November, at which time buyers arrive by truck to take the crop to market. The town also has a fruit plantation.

References

External links
Satellite map at Maplandia.com

Populated places in the Centre-Sud Region
Bazèga Province